Stara Bingula is a village located in the Sremska Mitrovica municipality, in the Syrmia District of Vojvodina, Serbia. This is the only ethnically mixed settlement in the Sremska Mitrovica municipality (with a relative Serb majority). Village population numbering 190 people (2002 census).

Name
In Serbian, the village is known as Stara Bingula (Стара Бингула), in Croatian as Pištinci, and in Hungarian as Óbingula.

Ethnic groups (2002 census)

Serbs = 58 (30.53%)
Croats = 55 (28.95%)
Slovaks = 32 (16.84%)
Rusyns = 23 (12.11%)
others.

Historical population

1961: 371
1971: 300
1981: 255
1991: 205
2002: 190

See also

List of places in Serbia
List of cities, towns and villages in Vojvodina

References

Slobodan Ćurčić, Broj stanovnika Vojvodine, Novi Sad, 1996.

Populated places in Syrmia
Sremska Mitrovica